High and Locust Streets Historic District is a national historic district located at Lockport in Niagara County, New York. The district encompasses 120 contributing buildings in a predominantly residential section of Lockport.   The district developed between about 1840 and 1936, and includes buildings in a variety of architectural styles including Greek Revival, Italianate, Queen Anne, Colonial Revival, Classical Revival, and Bungalow / American Craftsman.  Located in the district are the separately listed Chase-Crowley-Keep House, Chase-Hubbard-Williams House, and Thomas Oliver House. Other notable buildings include the F.N. Nelson House (c. 1850), Calvin Haines/Alonzo J. Mansfield House (c. 1860), J. Dunville House (c. 1907), Ambrose S. Beverly House (c. 1875), Dr. Martin S. Kittinger House (c. 1870), and F. N. Nelson House/Lockport Home for the Friendless (c. 1850).

It was listed on the National Register of Historic Places in 2014.

References

Historic districts on the National Register of Historic Places in New York (state)
Greek Revival architecture in New York (state)
Italianate architecture in New York (state)
Queen Anne architecture in New York (state)
Neoclassical architecture in New York (state)
Colonial Revival architecture in New York (state)
National Register of Historic Places in Niagara County, New York